Hobart Airport may refer to:

 Hobart Airport in Hobart, Tasmania, Australia (IATA: HBA)
 Hobart Municipal Airport in Hobart, Oklahoma, United States (FAA/IATA: HBR)
 Hobart Sky Ranch Airport in Hobart, Indiana, United States (FAA: 3HO)